Jamalabad (also Romanized as Jamālābād; also known as Jamal Abad Ghareh Kahriz, and Jamal Abad Ghareh Kariz) is a village in Shamsabad Rural District, in the Central District of Arak County, Markazi Province, Iran. At the 2006 census, its population was 349, in 75 families.

References 

Populated places in Arak County